Acerra is a monotypic genus of moths of the family Noctuidae. Its sole species, Acerra normalis, is found in North America.

References

 Acerra at Markku Savela's Lepidoptera and Some Other Life Forms
 

Hadeninae
Moths of North America
Moths described in 1874